The 1996 NCAA Division II Men's Soccer Championship was the 25th annual tournament held by the NCAA to determine the top men's Division II college soccer program in the United States.

Grand Canyon (12-4-5) defeated Oakland, 3–1, in the tournament final.

This was the first national title for the Antelopes, who were co-coached by Peter Duah and Petar Draksin.

Bracket

Final

See also  
 NCAA Division I Men's Soccer Championship
 NCAA Division III Men's Soccer Championship
 NAIA Men's Soccer Championship

References 

NCAA Division II Men's Soccer Championship
NCAA Division II Men's Soccer Championship
NCAA Division II Men's Soccer Championship
NCAA Division II Men's Soccer Championship